Renan dos Santos Paixao (born July 28, 1996) is a Brazilian football player. He plays for J2 League club Renofa Yamaguchi.

Club statistics (Japan only)
Updated to January 1, 2021.

References

External links

Profile at Renofa Yamaguchi

1996 births
Living people
Brazilian footballers
J2 League players
Renofa Yamaguchi FC players
Association football defenders